Dean Bruce Ellison (born 14 November 1977 in Lancaster, Lancashire) is a former motorcycle racer from Britain. Ellison is the older brother of former Moto GP and current British Superbike rider James Ellison.

Early career
Ellison started racing in 1996. In 1997 he entered the Superteen British Championship, finishing the season with a number of podiums. In 1998 he competed in the Aprilia 250cc Challenge, regularly finishing in the top five. Halfway through the season he was offered the chance to ride in the 250cc British Championship for D&B Racing, which at the time was his dream.

After proving that Ellison could be a contender in the British Championship, D&B owner Danny Gallacher asked him to ride his new 250cc Honda in the 1999 championship. This gave Ellison the opportunity to run in the top five and at the end of the season he was asked to ride a Superbike as a one-off in the British Superbike Championship.

Superbike racing
D&B Racing then made the switch to Superbike and asked Ellison to go with them, and in 2000 they contested the British Superbike Cup, Ellison learning his trade on a race-kitted Honda VTR-1000 SP-1. 2001 brought in more consistent results and a hard earned 12th place in the overall British Superbike Championship.

In 2002, equipped with a factory Ducati along with support from Ducati Corse, Ellison had an exciting year getting to grips with the Ducati. At the end of 2002 he was tenth in the British Superbike Championship and was desperate to get racing again in 2003. During the off-season Ellison continued to race - taking in Supermoto, motocross and endurance racing, simply to keep on a bike and improve his riding.

2003 brought mixed emotions with top 10 results (notably the May Bank Holiday round at Oulton Park) in British and World Superbike rounds and the frustration of mechanical failures and lack of power compared to the opposition.

At the beginning of 2004 Dean was left without a British Superbike ride after D&B Racing pulled out at the last minute. He was asked to help Phase One retain the World Endurance Championship, which Ellison had helped them win in 2003. By March 2004 Ellison had started developing Yamaha's brand new R1 in preparation for the first race in April. Along the way he competed for RP Bikes Suzuki in the British Superstock Championship, and for IRT Honda in the World Supersport.

In 2005 he took over his brother's former ride in the Jentin Racing Yamaha BSB team, without the same success. He left mid-season to join the Slingshot Racing team. His 2006 season with the SMT Honda team was wrecked by a crash at Oulton Park in which Dean picked up a serious knee injury.

For  he raced one of Donato Pedercini's Ducatis in the Superbike World Championship, usually well down the order. Due to lack of power his season was plagued with mechanical failures.

He returned to Britain for 2008, aboard the Co-ordit Yamaha. Ellison missed the rescheduled Brands Hatch round after a high-speed horror crash at Oulton Park. He took his first double point scoring finish of the season at Donington Park whilst still riding injured.

In 2015 Dean Ellison raced with Phil Seton for Seton Tuning and won the No Limits Endurance Championship and the overall win at Donington.

Personal life
Ellison lived in Kendal throughout his childhood, moving to various places while pursuing his dream to become a professional racer. After leaving school he studied to be a motorcycle and motor vehicle mechanic, gaining all qualifications with distinction.

In 1998 he settled down in the Midlands in Leicester until 2009 with his wife Susie, whom he married on 28 December 2008. He is the older brother of James Ellison and was James' biggest fan, working behind the scenes to find new sponsors.

Dean is still very active within the motorcycle world, working as an area sales representative for accident claims based in Ormskirk. He plays football, runs and still attends motorcycle track days, supermoto events and has confirmed his desire to race.

Always well respected for his fund raising efforts, Dean still takes time out to do his bit for charity. In 2011 he teamed up with Dave Winter and filmmaker Ben Barden to travel over 1000 miles in one go, raising money for his two favourite charities, Riders and  CJ Riders Fund.

References

External links
 deanellison.net Official website
 Dean's employment detail as a motorcycle mechanic

1977 births
Living people
English motorcycle racers
Superbike World Championship riders
Supersport World Championship riders
British Superbike Championship riders
Sportspeople from Kendal
Sportspeople from Lancaster, Lancashire
FIM Superstock 1000 Cup riders